Scabricola olivaeformis, common name the olive-shaped mitre, is a species of sea snail, a marine gastropod mollusk in the family Mitridae, the miter shells or miter snails.

Distribution
This species occurs in the Indo-Pacific off the Mascarene Basin and Réunion; in the Pacific Ocean off the Philippines, Hawaii,   Australia, Papua New Guinea, Japan and Okinawa

Description
The length of the shell varies between 7 mm and 21 mm

References 

 Arianna Fulvo and Roberto Nistri (2005). 350 coquillages du monde entier. Delachaux et Niestlé (Paris) : 256 p. 
 Drivas, J. & M. Jay (1988). Coquillages de La Réunion et de l'île Maurice
 Cernohorsky W. O. (1991). The Mitridae of the world (Part 2). Monographs of Marine Mollusca 4. page(s): 138
 Poppe G.T. & Tagaro S.P. (2008). Mitridae. pp. 330–417, in: G.T. Poppe (ed.), Philippine marine mollusks, volume 2. Hackenheim: ConchBooks. 848 pp.

External links
 Gastropods.com: Imbricaria olivaeformis
 Swainson, W. (1820-1823). Zoological Illustrations, or, original figures and descriptions of new, rare, or interesting animals, selected chiefly from the classes of ornithology, entomology, and conchology, and arranged on the principles of Cuvier and other modern zoologists. London: Baldwin, Cradock & Joe; Strand: W. Wood. (Vol. 1-3): pl. 1-18
 Fedosov A., Puillandre N., Herrmann M., Kantor Yu., Oliverio M., Dgebuadze P., Modica M.V. & Bouchet P. (2018). The collapse of Mitra: molecular systematics and morphology of the Mitridae (Gastropoda: Neogastropoda). Zoological Journal of the Linnean Society. 183(2): 253-337

Mitridae
Gastropods described in 1821